The Conway Confederate Monument stands on the lawn of the Faulkner County Courthouse, east of the junction of Robinson Avenue and Center Street in Conway, Arkansas.  It is a stone obelisk,  in height, with a square base  on each side.  The east face bears the inscription "1861-65 / (carving of crossed flags) / DEDICATED TO THE MEMORY / OF OWR CONFEDERATE SOLDIERS / THE
BRAVEST OF THE BRAVE / ERECTED BY / ROBERT E. LEE CHAPTER / NO. 718 U.D.C. / OCT. 1925".  The monument was funded by the local chapter of the United Daughters of the Confederacy and was dedicated in 1925.

The monument was listed on the National Register of Historic Places in 1996.

See also
National Register of Historic Places listings in Faulkner County, Arkansas

References

Buildings and structures completed in 1925
Buildings and structures in Conway, Arkansas
Confederate States of America monuments and memorials in Arkansas
Monuments and memorials on the National Register of Historic Places in Arkansas
National Register of Historic Places in Faulkner County, Arkansas
Neoclassical architecture in Arkansas
Obelisks in the United States
1925 establishments in Arkansas